Barbarians of the Bay is a Canadian comedy-drama film, directed by Vincent Biron and released in 2019. The film stars  as Yves, a hockey player who failed at the National Hockey League level and has been reduced to playing amateur hockey in La Malbaie, Quebec. After being sidelined by an injury that has prevented him from playing in the national championship tournament in Thunder Bay, Ontario, he enlists his younger cousin Jean-Philippe (Justin Leyrolles-Bouchard), who also loves hockey but aspires to be a sports agent rather than a player, to drive him on a road trip to the tournament in an attempt to reclaim his rightful glory on the ice.

According to Biron, the film was made with the intention of exploring the life trajectory of the many hockey players who don't make it to the big leagues rather than the relatively few who do.

The film held an advance screening event in Montreal on November 18, 2019 before opening in theatres on November 22.

References

External links
 

2019 films
Canadian road comedy-drama films
Canadian ice hockey films
Films shot in Quebec
Films set in Quebec
Films directed by Vincent Biron
2010s road comedy-drama films
French-language Canadian films
2010s Canadian films